Lois Waring (June 3, 1930 - February 15, 1989) was an American figure skater.  She competed in ice dance with Walter Bainbridge, and later with Michael McGean. She was the national champion with Bainbridge in 1947-1949 and North American Champion in 1947 and 1949.
With McGean, she was the national champion in 1950 and 1952.

Results
(with Bainbridge)

(with McGean)

Notes

American female ice dancers
Living people
1930 births
1989 deaths
20th-century American women
20th-century American people
21st-century American women